Sarbuk District is a district (bakhsh) in Qasr-e Qand County, Sistan and Baluchestan province, Iran. At the 2006 census, its population was 17,728, in 3,384 families.  The district has no cities. The district has one rural district (dehestan): Sarbuk Rural District.

References 

Qasr-e Qand County
Districts of Sistan and Baluchestan Province